Ikh-Uul  is a sum of Zavkhan Province in western Mongolia. In 2005, its population was 6,271.

References 

Districts of Zavkhan Province